Charlestown Sarsfields GAA is a Gaelic Athletic Association club in Charlestown, County Mayo, Ireland. Their most notable achievement was winning the Connacht Senior Club Football Championship in 2001. Tom Parsons is a notable current player, having won two Connacht titles with Mayo.

Name
It's known as Fr. O'Hara Park.

Notable players

 Tom Parsons
 Aidan Higgins
 David Tiernan
Colm Horkan

Honours 
 Connacht Senior Club Football Championship (1): 2001
 Mayo Senior Football Championship (3): 1902, 2001, 2009

References

External links 
Official site

Gaelic games clubs in County Mayo
Gaelic football clubs in County Mayo